Beulah is an unincorporated community in Douglas County, Georgia, United States.

Nearby communities
The nearby communities are Douglasville and Lithia Springs.

External links

Unincorporated communities in Douglas County, Georgia
Unincorporated communities in Georgia (U.S. state)